Sakhra or Sakhrah is a feminine given name which is used in the Arab world and in Muslim majority countries.

Sakhra may refer to:

People
La Sakhra, Belgian singer

Places
 Bazer Sakhra, town in Algeria
 Salma, Syria, known for its pure mineral water.

Other
 Sakhra, Foundation Stone inside the Dome of the Rock

See also
 South American Land Mammal Age, a geologic timescale term known by the initialism SALMA
 Selma (disambiguation)

Notes

Arabic feminine given names